Whisky & Gogo is an Italian comic series created by Luciano Bottaro.

It debuted in 1959, published in the comics magazine Cucciolo, and in a short time it named an eponym comic book series, published in Italy by Edizioni Alpe. The series, set in the American Old West, features a brown bear with the vice of drinking (Whisky) and an innocuous, easygoing trapper (Gogo).

References 

Italian comics
Italian comics titles
Italian comics characters
Comics characters introduced in 1959
Fictional bears
Comics about bears
Comics about animals
1959 comics debuts
Humor comics
Western (genre) comics
Comic strip duos